Mia Jackson (born December 15, 1989), known professionally as Tokyo Stylez, is a hairstylist and wigmaker originally from Omaha, Nebraska. she is best known for her appearances on E!'s Keeping up with the Kardashians and Life of Kylie as Kylie Jenner’s personal hairstylist. She has also styled Kim Kardashian, Gabrielle Union, Nicki Minaj, Kendall Jenner, Rihanna, Lil’ Kim, Doja Cat, Bethenny Frankel, Megan Thee Stallion and Cardi B.

Early life
Tokyo Stylez was born and grew up in Omaha, Nebraska. Her mother was incarcerated for part of her childhood. During that time, she was living with her father and little sister, and began to help her father by styling her younger sister's hair. By age 15, she was being paid to style hair around the neighborhood.

Career
Tokyo got her start by specializing in sew-in hair extensions but eventually moved into making wigs. Her first celebrity client was Tamar Braxton, however, it was not long until she began making wigs for Kylie Jenner, who found her on Instagram, then her career began to grow rapidly.

Tokyo has collaborated with makeup artist and beauty-influencer Hrush Achemyan and hairstylist Jen Atkin.

Wigs
Tokyo gained popularity as a wigmaker through designing wigs for Kylie Jenner and other celebrities. Tokyo claims that she has made over one hundred wigs for Jenner. She can make four or five wigs a day. She began making wigs for her friend's cancer charity and after many inquiries about purchasing the wigs, She eventually began making them for her own clients. She only uses real human hair when making her wigs and tries on almost every wig that she makes.

Tokyo made a custom wig for a high school student who was battling cancer after she reached out to her asking for a wig for prom. Tokyo and her team hand-delivered and styled the wig for her.

Touched by Tokyo Wig Boutique
Tokyo is scheduled to open a wig boutique in Los Angeles and eventually wants to open up international hair boutiques.

Personal life
In November 2019, Tokyo began the transition from male to female, documenting the gender transition on Instagram.

Tokyo has a boyfriend, Chris Aaron, who is also Tokyo's business partner and manager.

Filmography

References

External links

Official website

1989 births
American hairdressers
African-American people
Living people
LGBT people from California
LGBT people from Nebraska
People from Omaha, Nebraska
LGBT media personalities
Transgender women